Vanessa Gray (born 16 May 1971) is a former English rugby union player. She represented  at the 2006 Women's Rugby World Cup. She started ahead of Sophie Hemming in the 2007 Six Nations clash against  which they won 32–0.

References

1971 births
Living people
England women's international rugby union players
English female rugby union players